German submarine U-308 was a Type VIIC U-boat of Nazi Germany's Kriegsmarine during World War II. The U-boat was laid down on 5 November 1941 at the Flender Werke in Lübeck as yard number 308, launched on 31 October 1942 and commissioned on 23 December 1942 under the command of Leutnant zur See Karl Mühlenpfordt.

Design
German Type VIIC submarines were preceded by the shorter Type VIIB submarines. U-308 had a displacement of  when at the surface and  while submerged. She had two shafts and two  propellers.

U-308 was fitted with five  torpedo tubes (four fitted at the bow and one at the stern), fourteen torpedoes, one  SK C/35 naval gun, 220 rounds, and two twin  C/30 anti-aircraft guns. The boat had a complement of between forty-four and sixty.

Service history
U-308 carried out one patrol and did not sink or damage any ships. She was sunk on this patrol in the Norwegian Sea north-east of the Faroe Islands by torpedoes from the British submarine  on 4 June 1943.

Forty-four men died; there were no survivors.

References

Bibliography

External links

German Type VIIC submarines
World War II submarines of Germany
U-boats commissioned in 1942
1942 ships
U-boats sunk in 1943
Ships built in Lübeck
U-boats sunk by British submarines
Ships lost with all hands
World War II shipwrecks in the Norwegian Sea
Maritime incidents in June 1943